Mir Khavand-e Olya (also Romanized as Mīr Khavānd-e ‘Olyā; also known as Mīr Khvān-e Bālā and Mīr Khūnd-e Bālā) is a village in Khandan Rural District, Tarom Sofla District, Qazvin County, Qazvin Province, Iran. At the 2006 census, its population was 408, in 116 families.

References 

Populated places in Qazvin County